X bar, x̄ (or X̄) or X-bar may refer to:
 X-bar theory, a component of linguistic theory
 Arithmetic mean, a commonly used type of average
 An X-bar, a rollover protection structure
 Roman numeral 10,000 in vinculum form

See also
 X-bar chart, a type of control chart